Sing-A-Longs and Lullabies for the Film Curious George is a soundtrack album for the 2006 animated film Curious George consisting of newly-recorded music by Jack Johnson "and Friends". It was released on February 7, 2006. The "Friends" are Ben Harper, G. Love, Matt Costa, and Kawika Kahiapo, each of whom accompanies Johnson and his band on one track.

The album topped the charts in Australia, New Zealand, and Canada, where it remained at No. 1 for four consecutive weeks. On February 25, it became the first soundtrack to reach the top of the U.S. Billboard 200 chart since the Bad Boys II soundtrack in August 2003, and the first animated film to top the chart since the Pocahontas soundtrack reigned for one week in July 1995.

Track listing

Personnel
Jack Johnson – vocals, guitar, ukulele
Adam Topol – drums, vocals on "The Sharing Song"
Merlo Podlewski – bass guitar
Zach Gill – piano, vocals (lead vocals on "The Sharing Song")
Ben Harper – guitar and vocals on "With My Own Two Hands"
G. Love – vocals, guitar, and harmonica on "Jungle Gym"
Matt Costa – vocals and guitar on "Lullaby"
Kawika Kahiapo – guitar on "Talk Of The Town"
Child backing vocals on "The Sharing Song" and "The 3 R's" – Baillie, Kayla, Jaclyn, Torin, John, Noa, Kona, Moe, Thatcher, Brooke, Tahnei

Charts

Weekly charts

Year-end charts

Certifications

References

External links
Curious George the Movie website 
Official Curious George website

Jack Johnson (musician) albums
2006 soundtrack albums
Universal Records soundtracks
Brushfire Records soundtracks
Adventure film soundtracks
Comedy film soundtracks
Albums produced by Mario Caldato Jr.